"Not a Saint" is a song by Dutch DJ & producer Vato Gonzalez featuring vocals from Lethal Bizzle and Donae'o. It was released on January 6, 2013 as a digital download in the United Kingdom. The song is a remix of Lethal Bizzle's single of the same name featuring Donae'o. The remix received positive feedback from the public and was subsequently released as a collaborative single. It has peaked at number 20 on the UK Singles Chart.

Music video
A music video to accompany the release of "Not a Saint" was first released onto YouTube on November 22, 2012 at a total length of two minutes and thirty-two seconds.

Track listing

Chart performance

Release history

References

2013 singles
Vato Gonzalez songs
Lethal Bizzle songs
2012 songs
Songs written by Lethal Bizzle